Johan (Juho) Peura (24 May 1879, Laukaa – 26 May 1918, Tampere) was a Finnish carpenter and politician. He was a member of the Parliament of Finland from 1913 to 1916, representing the Social Democratic Party of Finland (SDP). During the Finnish Civil War he sided with the Reds and served as the president of the Revolutionary Tribunal of Tampere, for which he was imprisoned after the Battle of Tampere on 6 April 1918. He died in the Tampere camp.

References

1879 births
1918 deaths
People from Laukaa
People from Vaasa Province (Grand Duchy of Finland)
Social Democratic Party of Finland politicians
Members of the Parliament of Finland (1913–16)
People of the Finnish Civil War (Red side)
Prisoners who died in Finnish detention